Swept-plane display is a structure from motion technique with which one can create the optical illusion of a volume of light, due to the persistence of vision property of human visual perception.

The principle is to have a 2D lighted surface sweep in a circle, creating a volume. The image on the 2D surface changes as the surface rotates.  The lighted surface needs to be translucent.

Perception
Optical illusions
Psychophysics